The Last of Tha Pound is the second compilation album by the rap group Tha Dogg Pound. It was released on April 27, 2004, by Gangsta Advisory Records.

Track listing
"Don't Stop, Keep Goin" (original unreleased version) (featuring Nas) 5:04
"It Ain't My Fault (Pussy-Eater Cum-Hand Marion)" (featuring Bad Azz) 3:45
"What Tha People Say" 5:46
"School Yard (D.P.G.C. High)" 3:14
"Got to Get It Get It" (featuring Foxy Brown) 3:39
"Some Likk Coochie & Some Likk Di*K" 3:24
"Stories of Hoez We Know" 3:51
"Jakkmove" (featuring Outlawz) 5:20
"We R Them Dogg Pound Gangstaz" 2:45
"Started" 5:32

References 

Tha Dogg Pound albums
Albums produced by Daz Dillinger
2004 compilation albums